Nadine Capellmann (born 9 July 1965 in Würselen) is a German equestrian who has won been a part of two gold medalist teams in Team dressage. The first was at the 2000 Summer Olympics and the second at the 2008 Summer Olympics.

References

External links 
 
 
 
 

1965 births
Living people
German female equestrians
German dressage riders
Olympic equestrians of Germany
Olympic gold medalists for Germany
Olympic medalists in equestrian
Equestrians at the 2000 Summer Olympics
Equestrians at the 2008 Summer Olympics
Medalists at the 2000 Summer Olympics
Medalists at the 2008 Summer Olympics
People from Würselen
Sportspeople from Cologne (region)